The Mars race; or race to Mars; or race for Mars; is the competitive environment between various national space agencies, "New Space" and aerospace manufacturers involving crewed missions to Mars, land on Mars, or set a crewed base there. Some of these efforts are part of a greater Mars colonization vision, while others are for glory (being first), or scientific endeavours. Some of this competitiveness is part of the New Space race.

Rivalries
The race to Mars involves competition between manufacturers and nations. NASA has demurred in a potential rivalry with SpaceX or other manufacturers in any possible race to be first to Mars. It instead sees synergies in possible cooperation with such entities. However, politicians may push NASA into competition with private entities such as Boeing and SpaceX in getting humans to Mars. Former president Donald Trump has planned for NASA to reach Mars in the 2030s.

Boeing has stated that one of its rockets will lead to the first crewed expedition to Mars, before SpaceX or others will land a crewed mission. Boeing is the primary contractor on the U.S. Space Launch System (SLS) NASA rocket program that has the ultimate goal of a crewed Mars mission. SpaceX has declined to state that it is a race, or that it needs to race Boeing.

Blue Origin has stated that with its New Armstrong and New Glenn rockets, it may be attempting missions to Mars, head-to-head with SpaceX's Interplanetary Transport System. This may result in commercial competition going to Mars.

Virgin Galactic has expressed interest in future service to/on Mars.

In 2019, SpaceX started to develop their own hardware, the Starship with initial launches planned for the early 2020s, followed by a cargo mission to Mars planned for 2022 and a crewed Mars mission in 2024 with the goal of setting up a propellant depot and the beginnings of a Mars base. As of 2023, Starship has not yet reached orbit.

Inspiration Mars planned a crewed flyby of Mars using third party hardware but has been inactive since 2015.

It is widely thought that NASA and the China National Space Administration (CNSA) are in a tacit race to put humans onto Mars. China is projected to have a crewed follow-up to 2020s robotic exploration project sometime after that; while NASA has a timeline of getting there in the 2030s.

See also
 Space Race
 Moon landing
 Exploration of Mars
 Billionaire space race

References

Exploration of Mars
Colonization of Mars
Spaceflight concepts
Technological races